Chemical Workers' Union may refer to:

Chemical Workers' Union (Austria)
Chemical Workers' Union (Czechoslovakia)
Chemical Workers' Union (Finland), a member union of the Central Organisation of Finnish Trade Unions
Chemical Workers' Union (United Kingdom)